Hulse is a surname. Notable people with the surname include:

 Benjamin Daniel Hulse (1875–1950), English professional footballer, played for Blackburn Rovers F.C.
 Benjamin Harrison Hulse (1894–1961), American politician
 Ben Hulse Highway
 Cale D. Hulse (born 1973), Canadian hockey player
 Camil Anton Johan van Hulse (1897–1988), Belgian-American musician
 Carl E. Hulse (born 1954), American journalist
 Charles Hulse (1771–1854), British politician and Baronet
 Charles Westrow Hulse (1860–1901), English cricketer
 Chuck Hulse (1927–2020), American racecar driver
 David Lindsey Hulse (born 1968), American baseball player
 Edward Hulse (physician) (died 1711), English physician
 Sir Edward Hulse, 1st Baronet (c. 1682–1759)
 Sir Edward Hulse, 2nd Baronet (1714–1800)
 Sir Edward Hulse, 3rd Baronet (1744–1816), High Sheriff of Hampshire
 Sir Edward Hulse, 5th Baronet (1809–1899)
 Edward Hamilton Westrow Hulse (1889–1915), British Army officer and Baronet
 Edward Henry Hulse (1859–1903), British politician and Baronet
 Edward Jeremy Westrow Hulse (born 1932), Baronet
 Edward Michael Westrow Hulse (born 1959), heir apparent to the Hulse Baronetcy
 Erroll Hulse (1931–2017), South African pastor
 Frank Hulse (1913–1992), founder and former chairman of Southern Airways
 Frederick Seymour Hulse (1906–1990), American anthropologist
 Gary Hulse (born 1981), English rugby league player
 Hamilton John Hulse (1864–1931), Baronet
 Hamilton Westrow Hulse (1909–1996), Baronet
 , Brazilian politician
 Hiram Richard Hulse (1868–1938), American bishop
 John Hulse (1708–1790), English theologian
 Hulsean Lectures, University of Cambridge lecture series est. 1790
 Hulsean Professor of Divinity
 Joseph H. Hulse (1923–2013), Canadian biochemist
 Melvin Hulse (1947–2022), Belizean politician
 Merlin D. Hulse (born 1923), American politician
 Michael Hulse (born 1955), British translator and poet
 Penelope Anne Hulse, New Zealand politician
 Richard Hulse (fl. 1790–1812), British Major-General
 Bob Hulse (born 1948), English professional footballer, played for Stoke City F.C.
 Bobby Hulse (born 1957), English professional footballer, played for Darlington F.C.
 Robert Lester Hulse (born 1946), Belizean Olympic sports shooter
 Rob Hulse (born 1979), English professional footballer, played for Queens Park Rangers F.C.
 Rose Adkins Hulse (born 1980), British entrepreneur
 Russell Hulse (footballer), Belizean soccer player
 Russell Alan Hulse (born 1950), American physicist
 Hulse–Taylor binary
 Samuel Hulse (1746–1831) British Field Marshal
 William F. Hulse (1920–1995), American runner and chemist

Middle name 
 Alfred Hulse Brooks (1871–1924), American geologist
 Cecile Hulse Matschat (1895–1976), American geographer and botanist

See also
Hulce
Hulse baronets